Karl Friedrich Speck (February 9, 1862 – August 6, 1939) was a German politician.

He was born in Speyer and became a member of the German Reichstag in 1898, representing the Catholic Centre Party (Germany) until 1914.

Speck was president of the Bavarian People's Party from 1918 to 1929.

References 

1862 births
1939 deaths
Members of the Bavarian Chamber of Deputies